Hierococcyx or hawk-cuckoos is a genus of birds in the family Cuculidae. The  resemblance to hawks gives this group the generic name of hawk-cuckoos.

It is sometimes included in the genus Cuculus.

Species
 Moustached hawk-cuckoo (Hierococcyx vagans)
 Large hawk-cuckoo (Hierococcyx sparverioides)
 Dark hawk-cuckoo (Hierococcyx bocki)
 Common hawk-cuckoo (Hierococcyx varius)
 Rufous hawk-cuckoo (Hierococcyx hyperythrus)
 Philippine hawk-cuckoo (Hierococcyx pectoralis)
 Malaysian hawk-cuckoo (Hierococcyx fugax)
 Hodgson's hawk-cuckoo (Hierococcyx nisicolor)

References

 
Cuculidae